Magny-en-Vexin (literally Magny in Vexin) is a commune in the Val-d'Oise département in Île-de-France in northern France.

Population

Education
Public schools:
 Groupe Scolaire de l'Aubette: École Maternelle Albert Schweitzer and École Élémentaire Victor Schoelcher- Tél. : 01 34 67 27 60
 Groupe Scolaire du Centre: École Maternelle Paul Eluard  and École Élémentaire Anne Frank
 École Élémentaire Jean Moulin is in the Regroupement scolaire des quartiers d'Arthieul et de Blamécourt 
 One junior high school, Collège Claude Monet.

École Maternelle et Elémentaire Marie-Thérèse/Collège Marie Thérèse is a private school in the commune.

Public high schools in the vicinity:
 Lycée Jules Verne - Cergy
 Lycée Polyvalent Galilée - Cergy
 Lycée d’Enseignement Professionnel de Chars - Chars
 Lycée d’Enseignement Professionnel d’Éragny - Éragny
 Lycée Polyvalent de Jouy le Moutier - Jouy le Moutier
 Lycée Polyvalent d'Osny - Osny
 Lycée Alfred Kastler de Cergy-Pontoise - Pontoise
 Lycée Camille Pissarro - Pontoise
 Lycée Technique Jean Perrin - Saint Ouen l'Aumône
 Lycée Professionnel Industriel d'Epluches - Saint Ouen l'Aumône
 Lycée Camille Claudel - Vauréal

Private high schools in the vicinity (all in Pontoise):
 Lycée Notre Dame de la Compassion
 Lycée Vauban
 École Saint Martin de France

See also
Vexin
Communes of the Val-d'Oise department
Chipping Norton, twin town of Magny-en-Vexin.

References

External links
Official website 

Association of Mayors of the Val d'Oise 

Communes of Val-d'Oise
Burial sites of the House of Valois-Angoulême